One Year to Live is a 1925 American drama film directed by Irving Cummings and written by J.G. Hawks and Robert E. Hopkins. The film stars Aileen Pringle, Dorothy Mackaill, Sam De Grasse, Rosemary Theby, Leo White and Joseph Kilgour. The film was released on March 15, 1925, by First National Pictures.

Plot
As described in a film magazine review, in Paris, Elise is maid to the great dancer, Lolette. Tom Kendrick comes to bid Lolette farewell, and is intrigued when he watches Elise’s dancing when she believes herself alone. He falls in love with her, and deserts Lolette for her at the ball given in his theatre by Brunel, getting Elise in bad with Lolette. He declares his love, promises to write every day of his trip back to the United States and his return, after he is discharged from the army. Dr. Lapierre, who attends Elise’s bed-ridden sister, Marthe, loves Elise, bribes the janitor to destroy Kendrick’s letters and tells Elise she has but a year to live. Seemingly neglected by Kendrick, and with no money to leave to care for Marthe, Elise promises to become Brunel’s mistress when he has made a great star out of her. Kendrick returns on the night Brunel claims his reward. Lapierre confesses his deception, Marthe recovers, and Elise refuses to fulfill her bargain. She convinces Kendrick of her innocence and they are reconciled.

Cast

References

External links

1925 films
Silent American drama films
1925 drama films
First National Pictures films
Films directed by Irving Cummings
American silent feature films
American black-and-white films
1920s American films